Lawlers may refer to:

People
 Ernest Lawlers, a US blues guitarist, vocalist, and composer

Places
 Lawlers Gold Mine, a gold mine in Western Australia
 Lawlers, Western Australia, a ghost town

See also
 Lawler (disambiguation)